Cullimore's Quarry is a 0.9 hectare geological Site of Special Scientific Interest near the village of Charfield, South Gloucestershire, notified in 1974.

Sources

 English Nature citation sheet for the site  (accessed 9 July 2006)

Sites of Special Scientific Interest in Avon
Sites of Special Scientific Interest notified in 1974
Quarries in Gloucestershire